The Cornwall Celtics are Junior "B" box lacrosse team from Cornwall, Ontario, Canada.  The Celtics play in the OLA Junior B Lacrosse League.

History
The Cornwall Celtics joined the OLA-B in 2006 with the Hamilton Bengals.  These two teams are just 2 more teams in a huge expansion of the OLA-B in recent years.  Their first season was a good start for such a competitive level of play.  They first game was a 15–7 loss to the Gloucester Griffins on April 22, 2006.  On May 6, 2006, the Celtics picked up their first win against the Milton Mavericks, 6–5.  The Celtics did not make the playoffs in their first season, but that is to be expected in such a large lacrosse league.

Cornwall is better known as a hockey town, with the (now gone) Cornwall Royals and the Central Junior A Hockey League's Cornwall Colts, but the ownership group of the Celtics feel that they will be able to bring Lacrosse back to the forefront of Cornwall's sports community .

Season-by-season results
Note: GP = Games played, W = Wins, L = Losses, T = Ties, Pts = Points, GF = Goals for, GA = Goals against

References

External links
Celtics Webpage
The Bible of Lacrosse
Unofficial OLA Page

Ontario Lacrosse Association teams
Sport in Cornwall, Ontario